Chavisa Woods is a New York City-based author, and winner of the Shirley Jackson Award.

Background
Woods was born and raised in a rural farm town, Sandoval Illinois, and lived from 2000 to 2003 in St. Louis, Missouri, where she was a resident of the anarchist collective C.A.M.P. (Community Arts and Media Project). She moved in 2003 to New York City, where she resided and worked for A Gathering of the Tribes, art gallery-salon and small press, owned and operated by novelist and professor Steve Cannon. She now serves as the Executive Director of A Gathering of the Tribes, and the Editor in Chief of Tribes Magazine Online, tribes.org. She has written four full-length books, including a novel and two fiction collections. She is best known for illustrating the lives of those in the conservative, rural areas of the U.S.

Work
Chavisa Woods is a MacDowell Fellow and the author of four books: "100 Times (A Memoir of Sexism)" (Seven Stories Press, 2019), "Things To Do When You're Goth in the Country" (Seven Stories Press,2017), The Albino Album (Seven Stories Press,2013), and "Love Does Not Make Me Gentle or Kind (Fly by Night Press, 2009)."

Woods primarily writes literary fiction. Her work has received praise from The New York Times, Publishers Weekly, The Seattle Review of Books and many other media outlets.

Woods has presented lectures and conducted and workshops  on short fiction and poetry at a number of academic institutions, including: New York University (NYU), Mount Holyoke College, Penn State, Sarah Lawrence College, Bard College, Brooklyn College, Brooklyn Tech, Hugo and the New School. She currently leads select writing workshops throughout the year through Hugo House and Catapult.

Awards
Woods received the Shirley Jackson Award in 2018, for a story in her collection, Things To Do When You're Goth in the Country.

Woods was the recipient of the Kathy Acker Award in writing in 2018.

Woods was awarded the Cobalt Fiction Prize in 2013 for her short work of poetic prose entitled "Things to do when you're Goth in the Country".

Woods was the 2008 recipient of the Jerome Foundation Travel Grant for Emerging Authors.

Love Does Not Make Me Gentle or Kind was a finalist for the 21st Lambda Literary Award for Debut Fiction.

Other publications
Woods has published prose and poetry in a number of magazines, including:
 Lit Hub
 Electric Lit
 Tin House Magazine
 Sensitive Skin 2017 
 Cleaver Magazine 2013
 Adanna 2013
 Union Station Magazine 2011 
 The Evergreen Review 2011 
 Danse Macabre- Stonewall Issue, 2009 
 Poetz.com Green Issue, 2008
 Blue Fog Journal, 2007
 Cake Poetry, 2007
 Tribes Magazine, 2007
 The Red Doll (chapbook) – 2006
 Matador, 2006
 The BARD Gay and Lesbian Poetry Review, 2006
 Chronogram, 2006
 Conversations with the Other Woman (chapbook), 2006
 Where We Live, 2005,
 Calling the Red, Chapbook, 2005
 Xanadou, 2004
 Wildflowers, 2004
 In The Fray, 2004

Fiction
 Things to Do When You're Goth in the Country, Short Fiction Collection, Seven Stories Press, 2017
 "Zombie," Tin House, 2017
 "What's Happening on the News?" Short Fiction Quaint Magazine, 2016
 The Albino Album (Seven Stories Press, 2013)
 How to Stop Smoking.... Usama Sensitive Skin Magazine 2012
 "A New Mowhawk" Jadalliya 2012
 Love Does Not Make Me Gentle or Kind, Fly By Night Press, 2008
 "The Smallest Actions", The Fiction Circus, 2008
 "The Bell Tower", Prima Materia, 2006
 Short story in Fuzion 1003, 2004

Nonfiction
 An Economy of Tigers, Full Stop Magazine, 2020
 "Hating Valerie Solanas (And Loving Violent Men," Full Stop Magazine, 2019
 The Memoir I Never Wanted to Write, Lit Hub 2018
 100 Times: A Memoir of Sexism'', 2019
 Ten Books for Country Goths, Electric Lit, 2017
 Gentlemen, Close Your Legs, The Brooklyn Rail, 2012

Documentaries
 Rhapsodists'', 2004

Book reviews
 The New York Times, 2019
 Publishers Weekly
 Booklist
 Pedestal Magazine
 The Brooklyn Rail
 The Short Review
 GO! Mag

References

External links
 Emma Roberts Reads Chavisa Woods
 https://tinhouse.com/things-to-do-when-youre-goth-in-the-country-an-excerpt/
 Tribes Online -
 Interview at The Short Review
 Interview with KDHX literature for The Halibut
 Go Magazine review

Living people
American women poets
American lesbian writers
Writers from Illinois
American LGBT poets
Poets from New York (state)
Chapbook writers
Year of birth missing (living people)
21st-century American LGBT people
21st-century American women writers